Rowen Fernández (born 28 February 1978) is a South African former professional footballer who played as a goalkeeper.

Club career

Kaizer Chiefs 
Following a great season with The Students, Fernández was signed by Kaizer Chiefs from Wits University in 2001 along with midfielder Stanton Fredericks. Fernández was to be an understudy to Brian Baloyi, who was on the verge of landing a lucrative contract in Europe.

Fernández initially struggled to break into the first team, as Baloyi put up solid performances week in and week out. The big break finally came, when he made his debut in the Vodacom Challenge against Ghanaian side Hearts of Oak at Royal Bafokeng Stadium on 30 June 2001. Chiefs won the game 2–0. He made his PSL debut for Chiefs in a 2–1 win against Classic on 22 August 2001.

"Spider", as he is known due to his amazing love for creepy crawlies (snakes and spiders), was hospitalised in April 2003 after he was bitten by one of his spiders. He had also battled to command a first team place in the same season and only got a run in the 5–0 ABSA Cup first round victory against Sporting at Ellis Park.

However, the 2003–04 season started off very well for Fernández who was handed the number one jersey as Baloyi struggled with a niggling injury.

The former national under-23 star began his playing career at Benoni amateur side Benoni Northerns before joining Wits where he caught the eye of the under-23 selectors. He has six under-23 caps.
During the 2006–07 season he scored two goals.

He kicked his way into the history books in February 2007 when he pounced on the rebound, after Brian Baloyi of Mamelodi Sundowns could only parry his retaken spot kick and knocked the ball home from close range. The fact that Rowen had missed the kick and scored on the rebound meant that his thirty second-minute equaliser against Sundowns was not classified as a penalty, but instead it was recorded as a goal scored from open play. The other goal resulted from a spot kick in a match against his former club Wits in September 2006.

Arminia Bielefeld 
Fernández joined German Bundesliga side Arminia Bielefeld in June 2007 on a free transfer after being out of contract with Chiefs to team up with former Chiefs coach Ernst Middendorp who then coached Arminia. Fernández lost his place as first choice goalkeeper to Dennis Eilhoff after injury. On 1 January 2011, during the January transfer window, Fernández left Arminia Bielefeld for SuperSport United.

International career
Fernández made his full international debut for the South Africa national team in a 2–0 win against Tunisia in August 2004. He had hoped to be a part of his country's squad at the 2010 FIFA World Cup to be held in South Africa, but was omitted from the final 23 by coach Carlos Alberto Parreira in favour of Itumeleng Khune, Moeneeb Josephs and Shu-Aib Walters.

References

External links
 
 
 

1978 births
Living people
People from Springs, Gauteng
White South African people
South African people of Spanish descent
Sportspeople from Gauteng
South African soccer players
Association football goalkeepers
South Africa international soccer players
Footballers at the 2000 Summer Olympics
Olympic soccer players of South Africa
2009 FIFA Confederations Cup players
2008 Africa Cup of Nations players
Bundesliga players
2. Bundesliga players
SuperSport United F.C. players
Arminia Bielefeld players
Kaizer Chiefs F.C. players
Bidvest Wits F.C. players
South African expatriate soccer players
South African expatriate sportspeople in Germany
Expatriate footballers in Germany